Appenzell Meistersrüte is a village in the district of Appenzell in the canton of Appenzell Innerrhoden, Switzerland. Its population is about 700.

Villages in Switzerland